Camulogene was an Aulerci elder and leader of the 52 BC coalition of the Seine peoples according to Caesar. He put a scorched earth policy in place, burning Lutetia then trying to ensnare Titus Labienus's troops. He died in the Battle of Lutetia. The Rue Camulogène in Paris is named after him.

Notes

Bibliography 

Celtic warriors
Gaulish rulers
Barbarian people of the Gallic Wars
1st-century BC rulers in Europe